William Baumgartner is professor of surgery at the Johns Hopkins University School of Medicine and executive director of the American Board of Thoracic Surgery. He is known for his work in neurological protection during cardiac surgery. He was president of the International Society for Heart and Lung Transplantation for 1996–1997.

References

External links
https://www.hopkinsmedicine.org/profiles/results/directory/profile/0000238/william-baumgartner 

Living people
Year of birth missing (living people)
American transplant surgeons
Johns Hopkins University faculty